Judith Herzfeld (born 1948) is Professor Emerita at Brandeis University. Known for her work in  statistical thermodynamics,  solid state NMR and  chemical education, she is a fellow of the American Physical Society, the American Association for the Advancement of Science, and the Massachusetts Academy of Sciences. She is the author or coauthor of more than 180 scientific papers and a book.

Research contributions
Although trained as a theoretician, Herzfeld's interest in biophysics led her to also establish an experimental program.

For the first two decades, her theoretical program focused on understanding the spontaneous spatial ordering of self-assembled protein filaments in the crowded interiors of cells and its implications for the morphology and rheology of cells in health and in disease (e.g., sickle-cell disease). More recently, her theoretical program has focused on a semi-classical treatment of electrons in molecules to permit modeling of reactions that is efficient enough to provide insights into the effects of solvents on reaction mechanisms, rates and selectivity.

Her experimental program applied  solid state NMR spectroscopy to problems that are intractable by other structural methods. A long-term study focused on the mechanism by which the membrane protein bacteriorhodopsin enforces vectorial ion transfers that convert light energy to electrochemical form. A more recent study on the flotation organelles of aquatic  micro-organisms revealed that an amyloid pattern of protein assembly underlies their strength and interfacial stability. Other studies have elucidated the structures of amorphous polymers that form under prebiotic conditions. In the course of solving some of the practical problems involved in this work, she has also developed some methods that have been adopted by other spectroscopists. This includes analysis of spinning sidebands to extract local anisotropy information, and spectroscopy by the integration of frequency and time domain information (SIFT) to carryout rapid, model-free processing of non-uniformly sampled spin evolution.

Pedagogical contributions
Given the large choice of excellent textbooks covering the standard topics, lecturing in general chemistry is mostly redundant. Furthermore, the pedagogical literature has concluded that active learning improves understanding and retention. To thoroughly implement active learning in large chemistry classes, Herzfeld adopted the Peer Instruction method pioneered by Eric Mazur and developed a large, widely used set of ConcepTests that thoroughly covers the content of general chemistry. In further pursuit of active learning, she also designed some games to play through complex chemical scenarios and some drawing exercises that assist in visualizing the variables underlying chemical behavior.

As a broad survey of "the central science", general chemistry also provides an opportunity to tell the story of how our material world came to be as we find it today. Herzfeld has reorganized and updated a highly regarded general chemistry textbook according to this narrative, divided in six stages, from the condensation of fundamental particles into elements and molecules, through the formation of a planet blessed with water and sunshine, to the advent of life and the changes that human kind has wrought since the start of the industrial revolution. This approach is particularly suited to liberal arts colleges interested in bringing reflection on the human condition into the physical sciences.

Biography
The first born of young German-Jewish refugees, Herzfeld received her primary and secondary education in New York City public schools, supplemented by the resources of the city's public libraries, parks and museums, and by the  Girl Scouts of the USA. (She is a firm believer in the power of well-run public institutions.) She first became attracted to the sciences in an accelerated and enriched junior high school program mounted by the city in response to  Sputnik, began research during her last summer in high school (with Murray Goodman at the then  Brooklyn Polytechnic Institute), and won the First Army Prize at the National Science Fair during her senior year.

She received her university education at  Barnard College of Columbia University (bachelor's in chemistry 1967, advisor Bernice Segal),  MIT (doctorate in chemical physics 1972, departmental advisor Robert Silbey, thesis advisor H. Eugene Stanley) and the  Kennedy School of Government at Harvard University (master's in public policy 1973). She began her independent work as a tenure track assistant professor of chemistry at Amherst College in 1973, the first woman appointed to the faculty in the natural sciences at the then still all-male college. A year later she resigned to marry MIT scientist Robert Griffin.

Moving back to Boston, she took a position at Harvard Medical School, first as a member of the Biophysical Laboratory (led by Arthur K. Solomon) and then as a member of the Department of Physiology and Biophysics. There she represented her colleagues on the Faculty Council, served on the Faculty Docket Committee, and chaired the Joint Committee on the Status of Women of the Harvard Schools of Medicine, Dental Medicine and Public Health. Her two daughters were born during those years. In 1985 she moved to the Department of Chemistry at Brandeis University where her service has included two terms as a faculty senator, one term as the department chair (the first woman in that role in the physical sciences), and four terms as a faculty representative to the board of trustees.

Family 
Herzfeld is married to Robert Guy Griffin and they have two daughters, Sarah R. Griffin and Rachel H. Griffin.

References

1948 births
American women biochemists
Theoretical chemists
Brandeis University faculty
Living people
Fellows of the American Physical Society
Harvard Kennedy School alumni
Barnard College alumni
MIT Department of Physics alumni